Nordelta is an affluent city in Tigre Partido, Buenos Aires Province, Argentina, about  from Capital Federal. It consists of a large gated community made up originally of nine neighborhoods, founded in 1999 and known as the first ciudadpueblo ("city-ville" in English) of Argentina; it is close to the towns of General Pacheco and Benavidez. Nordelta has been referred to as "the Miami of the Argentina".

When compared to older gated communities in Pilar, Nordelta's natural features (trees, plants, etc.) stand out as too "artificial", because Pilar's trees, for instance, are very large and mature compared to Nordelta's miniature trees.

Because of its size and relatively affluent population, Nordelta has been able to develop and maintain a varied array of commercial and services infrastructure, including swimming pools, soccer and tennis fields, a shopping mall, a medical center, a sports club, four private schools, playgrounds, saunas, and more.  Over the years, there has been steady development of new neighborhoods as more and more people moved in. Also, it was one of the first places in Argentina to have a Telecom communications network of a totally new generation.

The Nordelta project has been criticised for encroaching upon the Paraná wetlands, the habitat for wildlife and, with other processes such as urban sprawl and the extension of farming, contributing to wildfires and reducing the capacity of the land to absorb rainfall.

The people of Nordelta created the Nordelta Foundation, in an effort to help improve the quality of life of poor people living in Las Tunas, a shantytown located very close to Nordelta.

History

The district was built on swampy land after it had been shaped into a series of lakes surrounded by grass and trees, making the place attractive for people seeking a calm life. The district is the largest and most successful example of gated communities in Greater Buenos Aires, and is said to greatly improve the urban setting and standard of living of the population in general in the area. In addition to the quiet and landscaped settings, the main attraction for residents is the multiple layers of security that make it much more secure than the surrounding area and other smaller developments. Consultatio, with Eduardo Constantini as head, was involved in the project as 50 percent investor.

By the year 2000, 98 people were living in Nordelta.

On December, 2004, 30 musicians on a raft on Nordelta's information center's lake, from the Argentine Orquesta Sinfónica Nacional, gave an open-air concert.

On May 6, 2006, pianist Horacio Lavandera played a concert to an audience of over 800 people. Proceeds were donated to the Nordelta Foundation.

A bit later on May 18, singer Fabiana Cantilo performed to an audience of 700 people. Proceeds were donated to the Nordelta Foundation.

On August 19, Vicentico performed to an audience of 1400 people, with proceeds allocated to the Nordelta Foundation.

Diego Torres held a concert in Nordelta to 3,000 people, sending the year 2006 off with a two-hour party; by the year 2007, approximately 10,000 inhabitants were living in the district.

On May 19, 2007, Horacio Lavandera, along with 30 musician of the National Symphony Orchestra under the direction of Pedro Ignacio Calderón, once again played in a concert in honor of Ludwig van Beethoven. The event was exclusive for property owners of Nordelta and their guests.

On June 2, Gustavo Cerati, a famous rock musician, staged a concert in Nordelta, with over 2,000 people attending. Proceeds from the tickets sold were allocated to the charitable organization Nordelta Foundation, to aid Las Tunas.

Another event that took place in Nordelta was the match between two famous tennis players: Argentine Guillermo Cañas and Spaniard Carlos Moyà.

 the development was one of the locations of the "Soltando Amarras" Bioflow program.

A severe car accident took place in Nordelta, on October 18, 2009. Four people died when a car sunk into an artificial lake inside the property.

In late 2021, there was an invasion of carpinchos (capybaras), which destroyed lawns, bit dogs, caused traffic accidents, and deposited excrement. Ecologist Enrique Viale said it was a mistake to view the influx as an invasion: "It's the other way round: Nordelta invaded the ecosystem of the carpinchos". Some critics of Nordelta as an enclave for the wealthy have satirically supported the carpinchos recovering their habitat. Capybaras have been used as a symbol of class war in Argentina.

Criticism
Environmentalists disapprove of Nordelta because it is built on the wetlands of the major River Paraná, second only to the Amazon in South America. Enrique Viale said "Wealthy real-estate developers with government backing have to destroy nature in order to sell clients the dream of living in the wild – because the people who buy those homes want nature, but without the mosquitoes, snakes or capybaras".

The vast Paraná wetlands have been encroached upon by urban sprawl and by cattle and soy farmers, partly responsible for wildfires that have destroyed vast areas. Wetland projects like Nordelta prevent the land from absorbing rains, so extreme rainfall leads to flooding of nearby, poorer, neighbourhoods.

Neighborhoods

Schools
Northlands
Michael Ham Memorial College 
Colegio Cardenal Pironio

References

External links
Official site
English version (archived) 
Unofficial site
Review of Nordelta
 Magazine on Nordelta 
 Unofficial newspaper on Nordelta 
Another unofficial newspaper on Nordelta
Satelital view of Nordelta
 Portal de Vecinos
The .nordelta TLD has been launched.

Tigre Partido
Populated places in Buenos Aires Province
Gated communities